The Chemin de Fer Économiques Forestiers des Landes was a narrow gauge railway in Landes, France which operated between 1907 and 1934. It was the only  gauge railway in France.

History

The CF Économiques Forestiers des Landes opened in 1907. It was the only public railway in France built to that gauge. The choice of gauge was said to have been influenced by the purchase of two second-hand 0-4-0T steam locomotives. When narrow gauge railways were first proposed in France, it was intended they could be constructed in either  or metre (3 ft 3 in) gauge, however pressure from the French military made metre gauge compulsory in 1888. Later  gauge lines were allowed. Traffic declined after 1918 and the line closed in 1934.

References

Sources

Further reading
.

Railway companies of France
History of rail transport in France
750 mm gauge railways in France
Railway lines in Nouvelle-Aquitaine
Railway lines opened in 1907
Railway lines closed in 1934